Highland Lake is a lake in the U.S. state of Maine. Formerly known as Duck Pond, the lake extends from the northern tip of Westbrook through the western edge of Falmouth into east Windham, Maine. The south end of the lake overflows via Mill Brook  through Westbrook to the Presumpscot River at Riverton. The shoreline of the lake is heavily developed with residences, seasonal cabins, and a state-owned parking area off Mast Road in Falmouth for the launch of canoes and car-top boats. The deeper northern basin of the lake in Windham has been stocked with brown trout, splake, alewife, and occasionally brook trout and land-locked Atlantic salmon. Highland Lake's shallow southern basin is favorable habitat for white perch and chain pickerel, and has been stocked with largemouth bass.

Sources

Lakes of Cumberland County, Maine
Reservoirs in Maine